Yuriy Olegovich Tkachenko (born 12 November 1972, Bolhrad, Odessa Oblast) - Ukrainian economist, businesspeople who was from 15 March 2014 until 20 November 2018 the head of the Cherkassy Oblast State Administration.

Awards 
 Orders of Merit, III class.

References

External links 
 Yuriy Tkachenko at the Official Ukraine Today portal

1972 births
Living people
Governors of Cherkasy Oblast
Ukrainian businesspeople
Recipients of the Order of Merit (Ukraine), 3rd class